Fan Girl is a 2020 Philippine coming of age film starring Charlie Dizon and Paulo Avelino. It is written and directed by Antoinette Jadaone.

Premise
The story revolves around Jane, an obsessed teenage girl (Charlie Dizon) who spent an unforgettable night with her idol, Paulo Avelino (as a fictional version of himself).

Cast
 Paulo Avelino as a fictional version of himself
 Charlie Dizon as Jane
 Bea Alonzo as herself

Release
Fan Girl first premiered in Japan at the 33rd Tokyo International Film Festival. The film was also the sole Filipino film selected for the main competition of the 24th Tallinn Black Nights Film Festival held in Estonia.

Fan Girl was released to a wider audience on December 25, 2020, as one of the official entries of the Philippine-based 2020 Metro Manila Film Festival. As part of the film festival which was modified as a digital event due to COVID-19 pandemic measures forcing the temporary closure of cinemas, Fan Girl was made available for online streaming via Upstream.

Reception
Fan Girl won major recognition at the 2020 Metro Manila Film Festival Awards Night including the Best Picture award. Leads Paulo Avelino and Charlie Dizon were given the Best Actor and Best Actress awards, respectively. Antoinette Jadaone was also recognized as Best Director. A scene involving Avelino exhibiting improvised frontal nudity also received significant reception in social media.

Accolades

References

External links

2020 films
Philippine coming-of-age drama films
Films about fandom
Films directed by Antoinette Jadaone